Tahir Efendi Jakova (1770–1850 or 1835), also known as Tahir Efendi Boshnjaku or The Great Efendi, was an Albanian religious leader of the Yakova region in Kosovo, as well one of the most known Albanian bejtexhi. He lived and served as a clergyman in Yakova. The best known work from him, Emni Vehbije (The Offering) was published with Arabic alphabet in Istanbul in 1835. A reprint of it with Latin alphabet was done in 1907 in Sofia, Bulgaria.

Life
Tahir Efendi is also referred as Tahir Efendi Boshnjaku (the Bosnian) because of his birthplace, the village of Lukare near Yeni Pazar, back then part of the Sanjak of Novi Pazar of the Bosnia Eyalet of the Ottoman Empire. He was a scion of the Saraçi clan, part of the Kastrati tribe. He is also known as the Great Efendi because he was the first müderris of the Small Madrasa of Yakova, located in the "Mahmud Pasha" neighborhood. He started the position right after finishing his studies in Istanbul in 1807. He also served as imam, poet, missionary, and educator.
Tahir Efendi was also a sheikh of the Bayramiye order of Sufism.

Poetry
His most known poetic work Emni Vehbije, written in Northwestern Gheg Albanian. It contains advises and reminders in the context of the Islamic moral laws. It was finished and published initially in 1835 in Istanbul. Seventy-two years later (1907), it was published with the Latin alphabet, adapted by müderris Ismail Haxhi Tahir Gjakova. It was publisher by the "Bashkimi" society and printed in the "Mbrothësia" publishing house of the Albanian activist Kristo Luarasi. Tahir Efendi wrote poetry also in Turkish, Persian, and Arabic.
He prefaced his verses with Arabic meters: a form of Raml (Failatun, failatun, failat), followed by the basmala, hamdala, and the "Praise of the Prophet" (Peygamber). A lot of citations from the Quranic verses and the Prophet's hadith are invoked as well, providing various effects. A number of his works are lost, while some of the Arabic or Persian verses are discovered in the late decades. One recently found work of his is Hyda Rabbem (God is my Lord), written in lyrics, in Ottoman language and it dates to 1832. It is kept only in three copies, two of which were copied by Bajram Jusuf Doli, whereas one by Muhamed Tahir Jaka, also from Gjakova. Also of particular interest is the Yakova dialect of the Gheg Albanian language he used.

References

18th-century Albanian people
19th-century Albanian people
Albanian Sufis
Albanian-language poets
Turkish-language poets
Persian-language poets
Albanian Arabic-language poets
1770 births
1850 deaths
People from Novi Pazar
People from Gjakova
Albanian religious leaders
Albanian imams
Kosovo Albanians
Bayramiye order
Divan poets from the Ottoman Empire
Albanians in Serbia
18th-century Albanian poets
19th-century Albanian poets